Faïza Guène (born 7 June 1985) is a French writer and director, best known for her two novels, Kiffe kiffe demain and Du rêve pour les oufs. She has also directed several short films, including Rien que des mots (2004).

Biography
Born in Bobigny, France, in 1985, to parents of Algerian origin, Guène grew up in Pantin, in the northeastern suburbs of Paris. She attended Collège Jean Jaurès, followed by Lycée Marcelin Berthelot in Pantin. She began studies in sociology at Université Paris VIII, in St-Denis, before abandoning them to pursue writing and directing full-time.

Her debut novel, Kiffe kiffe demain, was published in 2004 when Guène was 19 years old. It has sold more than 400,000 copies and been translated into 26 different languages. The novel was translated into English in 2006 by Sarah Ardizzone under the title Kiffe Kiffe Tomorrow (US) and Just Like Tomorrow (UK) . Her second work, Du rêve pour les oufs, was released on 2006 in France and translated into English by Ardizzone as Dreams from the Endz. 

Guène has written for Respect magazine since 2005.

Bibliography 
Kiffe kiffe demain. Paris: Hachette Littératures, 2004.
Du rêve pour les oufs. Paris: Hachette Littératures, 2006.
Les gens du Balto. Paris: Hachette Littératures, 2008.
Un homme, ça ne pleure pas. Paris: Fayard, 2014.
Millénium Blues. Paris: Fayard, 2018.
La discrétion. Paris: Plon, 2020

References

Sources 
Publisher's biography
Sarah Adams, "Voice of the people". Interview with Faïza Guène. The Guardian, 10 May 2006.
"Faïza Guène Biography", BookBrowse.
Mini biography in French

Living people
1985 births
21st-century French women writers
French people of Algerian descent
Algerian writers
People from Bobigny